Silberschlag may refer to:
Johann Silberschlag (1721–1791), German Lutheran pastor (1753–1766) and natural scientist
Silberschlag (crater), a crater on the Moon named after him
Eisig Silberschlag